The Hesperus Ski Area is located near the town of Hesperus, Colorado, which is in the south west part of the state. It is off of U.S. Highway 160 just west of the town of the same name.

Description
Ski Hesperus has 13 runs, of which 30% are beginner difficulty, 20% are intermediate and 50% are of expert difficulty. The summit elevation is 8,880 feet, the base elevation is 8,200 feet and the vertical drop is 680 feet. It features one rope tow (which has been closed for many years) and one double chair lift.  There is also a full service snack bar, ski and snowboard rentals, ski and snowboard lessons and a tubing hill.

History
Ski Hesperus opened in 1962. It has operated off and on over the years, and has been opened every season since 2006.

References

External links
Official website

Buildings and structures in La Plata County, Colorado
Ski areas and resorts in Colorado
Tourist attractions in La Plata County, Colorado